Suburban Airport  was a public-use airport located in Anne Arundel County, Maryland, United States, two miles (3 km) southeast of the central business district of Laurel. This airport was privately owned by Suburban Air Park LLC.  The airport was closed in 2017.

Facilities and aircraft 

A combination of grass, paved-pad, ramp, owner-maintained fabric hangars, and steel hangars were available for aircraft to base from. The airport hosted homebuilt experimental aircraft, and had been the primary construction site of several aircraft.

History 

Suburban airport was on ground once owned by the Snowden Family. The family manor "Birmingham" was built in 1690, and sat adjacent to the runway on what is now the northbound lanes of the Baltimore–Washington Parkway. The Snowden family cemetery sits just to the east of the runway. This historic location was the home of the first Iron production in Maryland, Patuxent Iron Works. Just to the west of the airport is a later Snowden family manor, Montpelier.

Suburban Airport opened in March 1960 as a family-run airport and fixed-base operation. The first manager was Morgan Stern. The first aircraft flown into the field was an Erco Ercoupe. By 1963, the operations building and maintenance hangar were complete and there were 33 aircraft based on the field.

The airport hosted meetings of the Experimental Aircraft Association and aviation-oriented youth education programs such as Young Eagles flights.

The airport had been a Piper Aircraft dealer.

In 2001, Suburban Airport was closed for operations by the September 11 attacks.  Aircraft had limited access to leave, then eventually arrivals and departures were granted under the flight rules of the Washington Air Defense Identification Zone.

Suburban airport was most recently owned by W18 LLC, an entity co-located with Bay Area Land Development and Polm Housing. The airport property is in a region affected by Base Realignment and Closure and gambling legislation at the nearby Laurel Park Racecourse. In 2004, Polm attempted to increase the zoning of the airport property from 21 allowable housing units to 641 units for a Workforce housing development called Riverwood. Polm publicly announced plans prior to the hearing to expand Suburban airport to support 300 aircraft, 100 hangars, helicopter charters, and operate a flight school if the increased zoning failed. 250 people attended the zoning hearing where the Riverwood zoning attempt did not pass. The same hearing passed zoning changes for Polm's Fieldstone development on the same road. In 2009, Polm offered to build a 715-seat privately run school if Riverwood zoning was approved.

In 2010, the Maryland Aviation Administration changed the criteria for minimum approach angles and marked the airport with new displaced thresholds. The thresholds shortened 1/3 of the runway for landing operations both ways on the 2,300-foot runway. Organizations that provided aircraft for Young Eagles flights had to relocate because the available runway was reduced beyond safe operating limits of their aircraft.

By late 2012, the airport owner had yet to expand hangars and operations as announced in 2004, efforts to bring gambling to nearby Laurel Park had failed, BRAC-related inflow ceased in 2011, declining home prices and interest rates from the recession greatly reduced the need for workforce housing developments, and the county's school and water demands were beyond capacity from overdevelopment. Suburban Airport's owner submitted plans to build the for-profit Monarch Global Village Academy Public Contract School for troubled children, managed by the Children's Guild, temporarily on the airport property in exchange for approval to build the Riverwood housing development. Anne Arundel County required the school to offset the impact of the proposed Riverwood development and overcrowding from other recently approved developments. After the county announced that it would seek school construction sites elsewhere in 2012, the project was started on a neighboring parcel once occupied by the Laurel Moose lodge and sold to the Children's Guild.

References

External links 

 

Defunct airports in Maryland
Airports in Maryland
Transportation buildings and structures in Anne Arundel County, Maryland